Crown Point (also known historically as Thor's Heights or Thor's Crown) is a basalt promontory on the Columbia River Gorge and an associated state park in the U.S. state of Oregon. Crown Point is one of the scenic lookouts along the Historic Columbia River Highway, providing a panoramic view of part of the Columbia River. The Point was designated a National Natural Landmark in 1971.

Vista House

The 1918 Art Nouveau style Vista House is an observatory at Crown Point that also serves as a memorial to Oregon pioneers and as a comfort station for travelers on the Historic Columbia River Highway. The building shows great sensitivity to its site in the Columbia River Gorge near Corbett, and is listed on the National Register of Historic Places.

Crown Point Viaduct
The Crown Point Viaduct, built in 1914, is a viaduct consisting of an elevated sidewalk supported by columns and a retaining wall which encircle the tight loop of roadway around Vista House (1918). The viaduct is a contributing structure in the National Historic Landmarked and National Register of Historic Places-listed Historic Columbia River Highway. Per the 2000 NHL nomination of the highway:This  spiral viaduct was constructed of reinforced concrete and runs for 225 degrees of a circle around Crown Point. It functions as a  sidewalk and curb with a  parapet wall on the outside of a  roadway cut into the rock formation. A dry masonry retaining wall stabilizes the hillside above and below the viaduct and masonry parapet walls that ring Vista House.

See also
Interstate 84 in Oregon
List of bridges documented by the Historic American Engineering Record in Oregon
List of bridges on the National Register of Historic Places in Oregon
US Route 30 in Oregon

References

External links

Historic Columbia River Highway
Crown Point State Scenic Corridor Oregon Parks and Recreation Department
Historic American Engineering Record (HAER) documentation, filed under Troutdale, Multnomah County, OR:

1938 establishments in Oregon
Columbia River Gorge
Historic Columbia River Highway
Landforms of Multnomah County, Oregon
National Natural Landmarks in Oregon
National Register of Historic Places in Multnomah County, Oregon
Parks in Multnomah County, Oregon
Rock formations of Oregon
State parks of Oregon